Blaca is a village in the municipality of Tutin, Serbia. The village had a population of 33 people at the time of the 2002 census.

References

Populated places in Raška District